Vyšní Lhoty is a municipality and village in Frýdek-Místek District in the Moravian-Silesian Region of the Czech Republic. It has about 900 inhabitants.

Etymology
The name Lhoty is plural of Lhota, which a very common name of Slavic settlement, derived from lhůta (i.e. "period"). The adjective Vyšní, originally Hornÿ (i.e. "Upper") was used to differentiate it from the older nearby sister settlement called originally Dolny neb Spodny Lhota, today Nižní Lhoty ("Lower Lhoty").

Geography
Vyšní Lhoty lies on the right bank of the Morávka River in the historical region of Cieszyn Silesia. The southeastern half of the municipality is located in the Moravian-Silesian Beskids, the northwestern half is located in the Moravian-Silesian Foothills.

History
The first written mention of a village called Warmnuthowitz, which could be the predecessor of Vyšní Lhoty, is from 1292, when the probable founder of the village Pašek Mudrý Warmund was mentioned. This village itself was then mentioned in a Latin document of Diocese of Wrocław called Liber fundationis episcopatus Vratislaviensis from around 1305, however it is disputed by some historians if it really is today's Vyšní Lhoty. Moudreho Lhota mentioned in 1524 still leaves doubts. The oldest record with the names of settlers is from 1580. Surely it was mentioned in 1584 as Hornÿ Lhota in the document sealing the selling of Friedeck state country by Stanislav II Pavlovský, Bishop of Olomouc, to Bartholomew of Wrbno. 

The Friedeck state country was split from the Duchy of Teschen in 1573 when the village must have already existed. It was a part of the Kingdom of Bohemia and the Habsburg monarchy. After World War I the municipality became a part of Czechoslovakia. In March 1939 it became a part of Protectorate of Bohemia and Moravia. After World War II it was restored to Czechoslovakia.

Sights
The most important landmark is the wooden Church of Saint Anthony of Padua from 1640, located on the Malá Prašivá mountain.

Notes

References

External links

Villages in Frýdek-Místek District
Cieszyn Silesia